is a Japanese manga series written and illustrated by Eiri Kaji. It began its serialization in October 2006 in the magazine, Ichiraci. The manga ended with a total of 11 volumes and 33 chapters.

Plot 
In the past year the crimes have increased. Things have been getting worse, especially near the capital. So the police headquarters and the leaders of a research institute worked together, forming a new investigation branch, called “Keishichō Tokuhanka 007 (Special Crime Investigation Department 007)“. Ichikawa Fuyuki, who recently becomes one of its members, had a very special ability... And she is paired with Kuze, a cool and very bishounen detective. Their combination proves to be the most dangerous one the police headquarters had ever seen!

Characters

Main Characters

•  
Kagami Kyōichirō is a 26-year-old police detective and Fuyuki's partner. He is mostly called "Kuze" by his colleagues. He is originally from the 1st Investigation Division but due to a kidnapping case where he had almost beat up the criminal to death, and so he was punished and transferred to this the Special Division.

Kuze is very serious and can be very over protective of Fuyuki. But there is a void in Kuze's heart that makes him unapproachable to others. The reason behind his withdrawn self is due to his little sister, Naoko. He was extremely close to Naoko out of all his siblings due to practically raising her. However when Naoko was five, she was murdered. This made him spiral into deep grief and guilt over not being able to protect her. After meeting Fuyuki, he slowly opens his closed off heart to her. And as the series progresses, he falls in love with her. 
 
• 
Ichikawa Fuyuki is a beautiful 17-year-old girl with special abilities. Fuyuki was sent from the Ichikawa Institute to join KT007, where she's partnered with Kuze. Even though she is seventeen, she is very mature for her age and is never fazed when seeing a murder victim's body. But on some occasions, she can be very childish especially around Kuze. She is very head strong but also kind.

Fuyuki has proven to possess telepathy which prove useful due to finding out a murder victim's last memories. Also on rare occasions, she can produce telekinetic powers. However, her powers are all controlled by the bracelet on her wrist. Despite their age gap, Fuyuki understands Kuze the most and is closest to him. She cares deeply about Kuze. She told Kuze that if ever finds his little sister's murderer and will try to kill him, she says she'll be there to stop him. As the series goes on, Fuyuki finds herself falling in love with Kuze.

Supporting Characters

 or 'Boss Kikuchi' as everyone calls him, is the team leader of the Keishichō Tokuhanka 007. Because of his craziness to "7", he added at end of the name of their branch. He often scolded Kuze for always acting on their own and especially of his super intimate closeness to Fuyuki.
 is a colleague and friend of Kuze, they were both came from the First Division. He is now everyone's assistant. Unknowingly to him, he is the only person whom Kuze trusted the most, and that Kuze will not say "please" to anyone but him. Hearing this from Fuyuki makes him happy. His most important task is to go with Kuze.
 is a member of Keishichō Tokuhanka 007.
 is a member of Keishichō Tokuhanka 007.
 is a member of Keishichō Tokuhanka 007.

References 

Shōjo manga